Voielia is a neighbourhood in the city of Kristiansand in Agder county, Norway. The neighborhood is located in the borough of Vågsbygd and in the district of Voiebyen. Voielia is north of Voietun, south of Rådyr, east of Bråvann, and west of Voieåsen.

Transport

References

Geography of Kristiansand
Neighbourhoods of Kristiansand